The Treaty of Guarantee is a treaty between Cyprus, Greece, Turkey, and the United Kingdom that was promulgated in 1960.

Article I bans Cyprus from participating in any political union or economic union with any other state. Article II requires the other parties to guarantee the independence, territorial integrity, and security of Cyprus.
Article IV reserves the right of the guarantor powers to take action to re-establish the current state of affairs in Cyprus, a provision that was used as justification for the Turkish invasion of 1974. The treaty also allowed the United Kingdom to retain sovereignty over two military bases.

Article IV entitled these three guarantor powers to multilateral action among them or, as a last resort if no concerted action seemed possible, each guarantor to unilateral actions confined to restoring its status according to the treaty as a democratic, bicommunal, single, sovereign independent state:

Initially, a bicommunal independent state was at stake because of the July 1974 coup and several Turkish Cypriot enclaves being attacked at the onset of the coup. Those circumstances made Turkey claim the right to unilateral action, as provided by the treaty, by first invading and creating a bridgehead and corridor between Kyrenia and Nicosia enclave.

In the second invasion campaign, Turkish forces invaded and held on to one third of the island, resulting in effective partition of the island and secession of the parts of the island under its military control. 

Turkish Cypriots and Turkey view the second invasion and the effective partition as legal, citing how bicommunalism had already ended from 1964 and onwards. They maintain that the Turkish intervention did not alter the state of affairs created by the 1960 treaties, as separated communities already existed before the intervention, after provisions guaranteeing equal status of the two communities had already been violated by Greek Cypriot amendments.

The treaty was concluded the same year that the Constitution of Cyprus was finalised, and the Zürich and London Agreement and the Treaty of Alliance between Cyprus, Greece and Turkey were written.

See also

Copy of the Treaty in PDF format:

https://peacemaker.un.org/sites/peacemaker.un.org/files/CY%20GR%20TR_600816_Treaty%20of%20Guarantee.pdf

 Cyprus dispute

References

1960 in Cyprus
Treaties of the United Kingdom
Treaties of Cyprus
Treaties of Turkey
Treaties concluded in 1960
Treaties entered into force in 1960
Treaties of the Kingdom of Greece
Cyprus–Greece relations
Cyprus–Turkey relations
Cyprus–United Kingdom relations
Greece–Turkey relations
Greece–United Kingdom relations
Turkey–United Kingdom relations